Magnier is a surname. Notable people with the surname include:

Cyrille Magnier (born 1969), French footballer
Dave Magnier (1916–1979), Irish Gaelic footballer
John Magnier (born 1948), Irish businessman
Lise Magnier (born 1984), French politician
Philippe Magnier (1647–1715), French sculptor
Pierre Magnier (1869–1959), French actor

See also
Magnier Peaks, mountains of Antarctica
Magnier Peninsula, peninsula of Antarctica

Surnames
French-language surnames
Surnames of French origin